Eugene Joseph McGuinness (September 6, 1889 – December 27, 1957) was an American prelated of the Roman Catholic Church. He served as bishop of the Diocese of Raleigh in North Carolina (1937–1944) and as bishop of the Diocese of Oklahoma City-Tulsa in Oklahoma (1948–1957).

Biography

Early life
Eugene McGuinness was born on September 6, 1889, in Hellertown, Pennsylvania, to Daniel and Mary (née Flood) McGuinness. He received his early education at the parochial school of Holy Infancy Parish in Bethlehem, Pennsylvania. He attended St. Charles Borromeo Seminary in Philadelphia, Pennsylvania, then earned Doctor of Both Laws and Doctor of Sacred Theology degrees from the University of Santo Tomas in Manila, Phillipines.

Priesthood
McGuinness was ordained to the priesthood for the Archdiocese of Philadelphia by Archbishop Edmond Prendergast on May 22, 1915. He then served as a curate at St. Paul's Parish, St. Agatha's Parish, St. John's Parish, and at the Cathedral of SS. Peter and Paul, all in Philadelphia. McGuinness was assistant director of the Society for the Propagation of the Faith (1917–1919), and field secretary (1919–1920) as well as vice-president (1920–1924) of the Catholic Church Extension Society. McGuinness served as executive secretary of the American Board of Catholic Missions (1923–1937), and was named a domestic prelate by the Vatican in 1929.

Bishop of Raleigh
On October 13, 1937, McGuinness was appointed bishop of the Diocese of Raleigh by Pope Pius XI. He received his episcopal consecration on December 21, 1937, from Cardinal Dennis Dougherty, with Bishops William O'Brien and Hugh L. Lamb serving as co-consecrators.

Coadjutor Bishop and Bishop of Oklahoma City
McGuinness was appointed coadjutor bishop of the Diocese of Oklahoma City-Tulsa and titular bishop of Ilium on November 11, 1944, by Pope Pius XII. After the death of Bishop Francis Kelley on February 1, 1948, McGuinness automatically succeeded him as the third Bishop of Oklahoma City-Tulsa. During his nine-year administration, McGuinness saw the Catholic population in the state grow by almost 40 percent and received 1,242 adult converts in 1957 alone. Priestly and religious vocations flourished, and he made trips to Ireland and Poland to recruit clergy.

Eugene McGuinness died on December 27, 1957, at age 68.

See also

 Catholic Church hierarchy
 Catholic Church in the United States
 Historical list of the Catholic bishops of the United States
 List of Catholic bishops of the United States
 Lists of patriarchs, archbishops, and bishops

References

External links
Roman Catholic Archdiocese of Oklahoma City
Roman Catholic Diocese of Raleigh, North Carolina

20th-century Roman Catholic bishops in the United States
St. Charles Borromeo Seminary alumni
Roman Catholic bishops of Oklahoma City
Roman Catholic Diocese of Raleigh
1889 births
1957 deaths
Roman Catholic bishops in North Carolina